Los Destellos (Spanish for "the Flashes") were a Peruvian cumbia band formed in Lima, Peru in 1966 by Enrique Delgado Montes.

History
In their early releases, Los Destellos popularized the sharp sound of the electric guitar and bass in the context of a cumbia ensemble. By replacing the horns and accordion with the strings, they played a key role in developing the genre that later became known as Peruvian cumbia, influencing bands such as Los Mirlos, Los Ecos, and Los Diablos Rojos. The band's style bears influence from psychedelic and surf rock as well as cumbia and local Peruvian genres.

In 1970, the band released their best-selling single, "Elsa", which sold over a million copies. Under Edith Delgado Montes' leadership, a reformed Los Destellos recorded several songs for the 2009 Peruvian film The Milk of Sorrow.

Discography
 1968: Los Destellos
 1969: En Órbita
 1969: Solo Ellos
 1970: Mundial...
 1971: En La Cumbre
 1971: Clase... Aparte
 1971: Constelación
 1973: Arrollando
 1974: Destellantes
 1975: Linda Chiquilina
 1976: Ojos Azules
 1976: En Jira Por Todo El Perú
 1977: Los Incomparables Del Ritmo
 1978: 10 años de triunfo
 1979: Yo Mismo Soy
 1980: Para Todo El Mundo
 1986: El retorno triunfal de Enrique Delgado y sus Destellos
 1996: Los Destellos Homenaje a Enrique Delgado
 2014: 38 Años de Cumbia Los Destellos

References

Peruvian musical groups
Cumbia musical groups
Musical groups established in 1966